This is a list of the symbols of the provinces and territories of Vietnam. Each province and territory has a unique set of official symbols.

Present

Administration

North

Central

South

Commerce

Historical 

 Flags

 Coat of arms

 Emblems

See also

 
 Flags of Vietnam
 Emblems of Vietnam

References

 Symbols of Vietnam : New discoveries